The Meki is a river in central Oromia, Ethiopia. It empties into Hora-Dambal at the latitude and longitude .

O.G.S. Crawford identifies the Meki with a river on a map which was drawn in 1662 (there named "Machy") to illustrate Manuel de Almeida's history of Ethiopia. Crawford explains that the cartographer learned of this stream from the Jesuit missionaries residing in Ethiopia at the time of Emperor Susenyos.

See also 
List of rivers of Ethiopia

References 

Rivers of Ethiopia
Southern Nations, Nationalities, and Peoples' Region